Artificial ventilation (also called artificial respiration) is a means of assisting or stimulating respiration, a metabolic process referring to the overall exchange of gases in the body by pulmonary ventilation, external respiration, and internal respiration. It may take the form of manually providing air for a person who is not breathing or is not making sufficient respiratory effort, or it may be mechanical ventilation involving the use of a mechanical ventilator to move air in and out of the lungs when an individual is unable to breathe on their own, for example during surgery with general anesthesia or when an individual is in a coma or trauma.

Types

Manual methods

Pulmonary ventilation (and hence external parts of respiration) is achieved through manual insufflation of the lungs either by the rescuer blowing into the patient's lungs (mouth-to-mouth resuscitation), or by using a mechanical device to do so. This method of insufflation has been proved more effective than methods which involve mechanical manipulation of the patient's chest or arms, such as the Silvester method.

Mouth-to-mouth resuscitation is also part of cardiopulmonary resuscitation (CPR) making it an essential skill for first aid. In some situations, mouth to mouth is also performed separately, for instance in near-drowning and opiate overdoses.  The performance of  mouth to mouth in its own is now limited in most protocols to health professionals, whereas lay first aiders are advised to undertake full CPR in any case where the patient is not breathing sufficiently.

Mechanical ventilation

Mechanical ventilation is a method to mechanically assist or replace spontaneous breathing. This may involve a machine called a ventilator or the breathing may be assisted by a registered nurse, physician, physician assistant, respiratory therapist, paramedic, or other suitable person compressing a bag valve mask or set of bellows. Mechanical ventilation is termed "invasive" if it involves any instrument penetrating through the mouth (such as an endotracheal tube) or the skin (such as a tracheostomy tube). There are two main modes of mechanical ventilation within the two divisions: positive pressure ventilation, where air (or another gas mix) is pushed into the trachea, and negative pressure ventilation, where air is, in essence, sucked into the lungs.

Tracheal intubation is often used for short-term mechanical ventilation. A tube is inserted through the nose (nasotracheal intubation) or mouth (orotracheal intubation) and advanced into the trachea. In most cases tubes with inflatable cuffs are used for protection against leakage and aspiration. Intubation with a cuffed tube is thought to provide the best protection against aspiration. Tracheal tubes inevitably cause pain and coughing. Therefore, unless a patient is unconscious or anesthetized for other reasons, sedative drugs are usually given to provide tolerance of the tube. Other disadvantages of tracheal intubation include damage to the mucosal lining of the nasopharynx or oropharynx and subglottic stenosis.

In an emergency a cricothyrotomy can be used by health care professionals, where an airway is inserted through a surgical opening in the cricothyroid membrane. This is similar to a tracheostomy but a cricothyrotomy is reserved for emergency access.  This is usually only used when there is a complete blockage of the pharynx or there is massive maxillofacial injury, preventing other adjuncts being used.

Neurostimulation

Diaphragm pacing is the rhythmic application of electrical impulses to the diaphragm. Historically, this has been accomplished through the electrical stimulation of a phrenic nerve by an implanted receiver/electrode, though today an alternative option of attaching percutaneous wires to the diaphragm exists.

History
The Greek physician Galen may have been the first to describe artificial ventilation: "If you take a dead animal and blow air through its larynx through a reed, you will fill its bronchi and watch its lungs attain the greatest distention." Vesalius too describes ventilation by inserting a reed or cane into the trachea of animals.

In 1773, English physician William Hawes (1736–1808) began publicizing the power of artificial ventilation to resuscitate people who superficially appeared to have drowned. For a year he paid a reward out of his own pocket to any one bringing him a body rescued from the water within a reasonable time of immersion. Thomas Cogan, another English physician, who had become interested in the same subject during a stay at Amsterdam, where was instituted in 1767 a society for preservation of life from accidents in water, joined Hawes in his crusade. In the summer of 1774 Hawes and Cogan each brought fifteen friends to a meeting at the Chapter Coffee-house, St Paul's Churchyard, where they founded the Royal Humane Society as a campaigning group for first aid and resuscitation. Some methods and equipment were similar to methods used today, such as wooden pipes used in the victims nostrils to blow air into the lungs. Others, bellows with a flexible tube for blowing tobacco smoke through the anus to revive vestigial life in the victim's intestines, were discontinued with the eventual further understanding of respiration.

The 1856 works of English physician and physiologist Marshall Hall recommended against using any type of bellows/positive pressure ventilation, views that held sway for several decades. Another manual technique, the "prone pressure" method, was introduced by Sir Edward Sharpey Schafer in 1903. It involved placing the patient on his stomach and applying pressure to the lower part of the ribs. It was the standard method of artificial respiration taught in Red Cross and similar first aid manuals for decades, until mouth-to-mouth resuscitation became the preferred technique in mid-century.

The shortcomings of manual manipulation led doctors in the 1880s to come up with improved methods of mechanical ventilation, including Dr. George Edward Fell's "Fell method" or "Fell Motor", consisting of a bellows and a  breathing valve to pass air through a tracheotomy, and his collaboration with Dr. Joseph O'Dwyer to invent the Fell-O'Dwyer apparatus, a bellows and instruments for the insertion and extraction of a tube down the patients trachea. Such methods were still looked upon as harmful and were not adopted for many years.

In 2020, the supply of mechanical ventilation became a central question for public health officials due to 
2019–20 coronavirus pandemic related shortages.

See also
2019–20 coronavirus pandemic related shortages#Mechanical ventilation
Cardiopulmonary resuscitation
Medical emergency
Medical ventilator
Two-balloon experiment

Charles Hederer, inventor of the pulmoventilateur
Edward Albert Sharpey-Schafer

References

External links

e-Medicine, article on mechanical ventilation along with technical information.
International Ventilator Users Network (IVUN), Resource of information for users of home mechanical ventilation.
Mechanical Ventilation, (detailed slideshow presentation), by Amirali Nader, MD FCCP,  Critical Care Medicine, Suburban Hospital, Johns Hopkins Medicine.

Mechanical ventilation
Emergency medicine
Intensive care medicine
Emergency medical services
Respiratory system procedures
Respiratory therapy
First aid